Syria is located in Western Asia, north of the Arabian Peninsula, at the eastern end of the Mediterranean Sea. It is bordered by Turkey to the north, Lebanon and Israel to the west and southwest, Iraq to the east, and Jordan to the south. It consists of mountain ranges in the west and a steep area inland. In the east is the Syrian Desert and in the south is the Jabal al-Druze Range. The former is bisected by the Euphrates valley. A dam built in 1973 on the Euphrates created a reservoir named Lake Assad, the largest lake in Syria. Between the humid Mediterranean coast and the arid desert regions lies a semiarid steep zone extending across three-quarters of the country, which receives hot, dry winds blowing across the desert. Syria is extensively depleted, with 28 percent of the land arable, 4 percent dedicated to permanent crops, 46 percent utilized as meadows and pastures, and only 3 percent forest and woodland.

Syria is divided into fourteen governorates, or muhafazat (singular: muhafazah). The governorates are divided into a total of sixty districts, or manatiq (sing. mintaqah), which are further divided into sub-districts, or nawahi (sing. nahiya). The capital Damascus is the second largest city in Syria, and the metropolitan area is a governorate on its own. Aleppo (population 2,301,570) in northern Syria is the largest city. Latakia along with Tartus are Syria's main ports on the Mediterranean Sea.

Geographical regions

The area includes about 185,180 square kilometers of deserts, plains, and mountains. It is divided into a coastal zone—with a narrow, double mountain belt enclosing a depression in the west—and a much larger eastern plateau. Fertile land is the state's most important natural resource, and efforts have been made to increase the amount of arable land through irrigation projects.

Coastal plain

Along the Mediterranean, a narrow coastal plain stretches south from the Turkish border to Lebanon. The flatness of this littoral, covered with sand dunes, is broken only by lateral promontories running down from the mountains to the sea. The major ports are Latakia and Tartous. However, in 2003, Syria unilaterally declared its maritime zones, adhering to the 12 nautical miles allowed by the United Nations Law of the Sea.

Upland areas
The Jabal an Nusayriyah, a mountain range paralleling the coastal plain, has an average elevation of just over 1,212 meters above sea level; the highest peak, Nabi Yunis, is about 1,575 meters above sea level. The western slopes catch moisture-laden western sea winds and are thus more fertile and more heavily populated than the eastern slopes, which receive only hot, dry winds blowing across the desert. Before reaching the Lebanese border and the Anti-Lebanon Mountains, the Jabal an Nusayriyah range terminates, leaving a corridor—the Homs Gap—through which run the highway and railroad from Homs to the Lebanese port of Tripoli. For centuries the Homs Gap has been a favorite trade and invasion route from the coast to the country's interior and to other parts of Asia. Eastward, the line of al-Ansariyah mountains is separated from the Jabal az Zawiyah range and the plateau region by the Al Ghab valley, a fertile, irrigated trench crossed by the meandering Orontes River.

Inland and farther south, the Anti-Lebanon Mountains rise to peaks of over 2,700 meters above sea level on the Syrian-Lebanese frontier and spread in spurs eastward toward the plateau region. The eastern slopes have little rainfall and vegetation and merge eventually with the desert.

In the southwest, the lofty Mount Hermon (Jabal ash Shaykh), also on the border between Syria and Lebanon, descends to the Hawran Plateau that receives rain-bearing winds from the Mediterranean. All but the lowest slopes of Mount Hermon are uninhabited, however. Volcanic cones, some of which reach over 900 meters, intersperse the open, rolling, once-fertile Hawran Plateau south of Damascus and east of the Anti-Lebanon Mountains. Southwest of the Hawran lies the high volcanic region of the Jabal al-Druze range home of the country's Druze population. This is part of the Harrat ash Shaam volcanic field that stretches all the way to Saudi Arabia. Northeast of Jabal al-Druze is a large lava field called Al-Safa that stands out in satellite views.

Eastern plateau

The entire eastern plateau region is intersected by a low chain of mountains, the Jabal ar Ruwaq, the Jabal Abu Rujmayn, and the Jebel Bishri, extending northeastward from the Jabal Al Arab to the Euphrates. South of these mountains lies a barren desert region known as the Hamad. North of the Jabal ar Ruwaq and east of the city of Homs is another barren area known as the Homs Desert, which has a hard-packed dirt surface.

Northeast of the Euphrates, which originates in the mountains of Turkey and flows diagonally across Syria into Iraq, is the fertile Jazira region.  This region is watered by two tributaries to the Euphrates, the Balikh and the Khabur. The area underwent irrigation improvements during the 1960s and 1970s, and it provides substantial cereal and cotton crops. Oil and natural gas discoveries in the extreme northeastern portion of the Jazira have significantly enhanced the region's economic potential.

Water

The country's waterways are of vital importance to its agricultural development. The longest and most important river is the Euphrates, which represents more than 80 percent of Syria's water resources. Its main left-bank tributaries, the Balikh and the Khabur, are small perennial rivers that both rise in the Syro-Turkish border region. The right-bank tributaries of the Euphrates are mostly small seasonal streams called wadis. In 1973, Syria completed construction of the Tabqa Dam on the Euphrates River upstream from the town of Raqqa. The dam created a reservoir named Lake Assad (Buhayrat al Assad), a body of water about 80 kilometers long and averaging eight kilometers in width.

Throughout the arid plateau region east of Damascus, oases, streams, and a few interior rivers that empty into swamps and small lakes provide water for local irrigation. Most important of these is the Barada, a river that rises in the Anti-Lebanon Mountains and disappears into the desert. The Barada creates the Al Ghutah Oasis, site of Damascus. This verdant area, some 370 square kilometers, has enabled Damascus to prosper since ancient times. In the mid-1980s, the size of Al Ghutah was gradually being eroded as suburban housing and light industry from Damascus encroached on the oasis.

Areas in the Jazira have been brought under cultivation with the waters of the Khabur River (Nahr al Khabur). The Sinn, a minor river which marks the borders between Tartus Governorate and Latakia Governorate, is used to irrigate the area west of the Jabal an Nusayriyah, about 32 kilometers southwest of the port of Latakia. In the south the springs that feed the upper Yarmouk River are diverted for irrigation of the Hawran. Underground water reservoirs that are mainly natural springs are tapped for both irrigation and drinking. The richest in underground water resources is the Al Ghab region, which contains about 19 major springs and underground rivers that have a combined yield of thousands of liters per minute.

Climate

The most striking feature of the climate is the contrast. Between the humid Mediterranean coast and the arid desert regions lies a semiarid steppe zone extending across three-quarters of the country and bordered on the west by the Anti-Lebanon Mountains and the Jabal an Nusayriyah, on the north by the Turkish mountain region, and on the southeast by the Jabal al Arab, Jabal ar Ruwaq, Jabal Abu Rujmayn, and the Jabal Bishri ranges.

Most of the rain, carried by winds from the Mediterranean, falls between November and May. Because the high ridges of the Jabal an Nusayriyah catch most of the rains from the Mediterranean, the Al Ghab depression, located east of these mountains, is in a relatively arid zone with warm, dry winds and scanty rainfall. Frost is unknown in any season, although the peaks of the Jabal an Nusayriyah are sometimes snow-covered.

Farther south, rain-bearing clouds from the Mediterranean pass through the gap between the Jabal an Nusayriyah and the Anti-Lebanon Mountains, reaching the area of Homs and, sometimes, the steppe region east of that city. The vicinity of the capital is, nevertheless, verdant and cultivable because of irrigation from the Barada River by aqueducts built during Roman times.

In the southeast, the humidity decreases, and annual precipitation falls below . The scanty amounts of rain, moreover, are highly variable from year to year, causing periodic droughts. In the barren stony desert south of the Jabal ar Ruwaq, Jabal Abu Rujmayn, and Jabal Bishri ranges, temperatures in July often exceed . Sandstorms, common during February and May, damage vegetation and prevent grazing. North of the desert ranges and east of the Al Ghab depression lie the vast steppes of the plateau, where cloudless skies and high daytime temperatures prevail during the summer, but frosts, at times severe, are common from November to March. Precipitation averages  a year but falls below  in a large belt along the southern desert area. In this belt, only the Euphrates and Khabur rivers provide sufficient water for settlement and cultivation.

Resources and land use
Natural resources:
petroleum, phosphates, chrome and manganese ores, asphalt, iron ore, rock salt, marble, gypsum, hydropower

Land use:
arable land:
24.8%
permanent crops:
4.47%
other:
70.73% (2005)

Irrigated land:
13.560 km2 (2003)

Total renewable water resources:
46.1 cu km (1997)

Area and boundaries
Area:
total:
185,180 km²
land:
183,630 km²
water:
1,550 km²

Land boundaries:
total:
2,253 km
border countries:
Iraq 605 km, Israel 76 km, Jordan 375 km, Lebanon 375 km, Turkey 822 km

Coastline:

Maritime claims:
contiguous zone:
 
territorial sea:

Elevation extremes:
lowest point:
unnamed location near Lake Tiberias (Sea of Galilee) -200 m
highest point:
Mount Hermon 2,814 m

Environmental concerns

Natural hazards:
dust storms, sandstorms, earthquakes

Environment - current issues:
deforestation; overgrazing; soil erosion; desertification; water pollution from dumping of raw sewage and wastes from petroleum refining; inadequate supplies of potable water

Environment - international agreements:
party to:
Biodiversity, Climate Change, Desertification, Endangered Species, Hazardous Wastes, Ozone Layer Protection, Ship Pollution (MARPOL 73/78), Wetlands
signed, but not ratified:
Environmental Modification

References

 

bn:সিরিয়া#ভূগোল